Kelly Bires (born August 25, 1984) is an American professional stock car racing driver. He most recently drove part-time for Go Green Racing in the NASCAR Sprint Cup Series and Nationwide Series. Previously, Bires drove competitively for JTG Daugherty Racing, JR Motorsports, and Braun Racing in the Nationwide Series.

Early career
Bires began karting at Sugar River Raceway in Brodhead, Wisconsin at age 9 and began competing in national karting events at age 12. He won several regional titles and two national championships.

He became the Great Lakes Allison Legacy Series Rookie of the Year in 2000, and followed up the championship by winning the series in 2001. Bires next moved up to the Super Late Model race cars at Dells Motor Speedway, finishing fifth in points and named 2002 Rookie of the Year. The following year he finished second in championship points. Bires made his first start in ARCA in May 2004. In 2006, he joined up with veteran American Speed Association Late Model Series crew chief Howie Lettow and won the season championship that year.

NASCAR career

2007–2008
In the 2007 NASCAR Craftsman Truck Series, Bires was the driver of the #21 Wood Brothers Racing truck in 19 races, handing over driving duties for the other six races to veteran Mark Martin. He had a tenth-place finish at Atlanta. After the departure of Jon Wood due to illness, Bires left the Truck Series and started racing for Tad Geschickter beginning at Nashville Superspeedway. His best Busch Series start was 26th and best finish was 7th in the Meijer 300 presented by Oreo race at Kentucky Speedway. Named the permanent driver of the #47 car in 2008, Bires had six top-ten finishes en route to a 13th-place points finish. But with Clorox/Kingsford moving up with Marcos Ambrose to the Sprint Cup Series, he was left without a full-time ride at the end of the season due to lack of sponsorship.

2009 to present
Bires spent the 2009 season driving for various teams, including Braun Racing, MSRP Motorsports, and JTG, where he start and parked, as well as competing for Kevin Harvick Incorporated and CJM Racing. His best finish that year came at Iowa Speedway, where he finished fifth in Braun's Fraternal Order of Eagles Toyota. Bires also had a 10th-place finish for KHI at Nashville. At the end of the season, Bires signed a two-year contract to drive for JR Motorsports in the #88 Chevy through 2011, with Earnhardt eager to see what Bires could do in his equipment. Bires drove the #5 Ragu Chevy for Junior at Homestead in preparation for running full-time in 2010.

Due to sponsorship obligations with Unilever and their Hellmann's Mayonnaise brand, Dale Earnhardt Jr. ran the #88 car at the 2010 season opener at Daytona and Danica Patrick ran the #7 car with her sponsor GoDaddy.com, forcing Bires to sit out. In his debut at Fontana, he did have a seventh-place finish. Even more curious than his missing Daytona was when Bires was removed from the #88 car in favor of Cup driver Jamie McMurray after only five races run, with only one finish below 17th (a crash at Las Vegas). Earnhardt Jr. cited chemistry issues between Bires, JR Motorsports management, and the team including Tony Eury Sr. and Jr., and implied that Bires was taking a seat from "the next Brad [Keselowski], the next Jeff Gordon." Prior to Brad Keselowski, the team had also hastily released Mark McFarland in 2006 after 21 races and Shane Huffman in 2007 after 18 races. Bires returned to the Braun Racing #10 at Richmond, where he finished 11th, then ran races for Baker-Curb Racing, Team Rensi Motorsports, and RAB Racing.

Bires returned to the Nationwide Series in 2011, driving for Rensi. However, Bires had to start and park his #25 on numerous occasions, and withdrew from two races. After Rensi cut back its schedule, Bires was hired by Joe Gibbs Racing to drive their #18 Toyota at Richmond and Chicagoland. Bires also ran two races as a start and park in Go Green Racing's 04 car.

Bires attempted six races in the Sprint Cup Series in 2012 for Go Green, making 3 races but finishing no better than 38th. Bires was released from both the Cup and Nationwide rides in November.

In 2013, Bires became crew chief for the late model team of Matt Kenseth's son Ross Kenseth.

Motorsports career results

NASCAR
(key) (Bold – Pole position awarded by qualifying time. Italics – Pole position earned by points standings or practice time. * – Most laps led.)

Sprint Cup Series

Daytona 500

Nationwide Series

 Season still in progress
 Ineligible for series points

Craftsman Truck Series

References

External links

 
 

Living people
1984 births
People from Mauston, Wisconsin
Racing drivers from Wisconsin
NASCAR drivers
JR Motorsports drivers
Joe Gibbs Racing drivers
ARCA Midwest Tour drivers